Marlin Oliver Briscoe (September 10, 1945 – June 27, 2022), nicknamed "the Magician", was an American professional football player who was a quarterback and wide receiver in the American Football League (AFL) and National Football League (NFL). In October 1968, after being drafted by the AFL's Denver Broncos, he became the first black starting quarterback in professional football, and established a Denver rookie record of 14 touchdown passes that season. He played professionally for nine years.

Early life
Briscoe was born in Oakland, California, on September 10, 1945.  He relocated to Omaha, Nebraska, with his mother when he was five years old after his parents divorced.  He attended Omaha South High School, where he starred in several sports and played at running back for a football team that won the state championship.

College career
After graduating from high school, Briscoe played college football at Omaha University from 1963 to 1967. The year after he graduated, his college's name was changed to University of Nebraska at Omaha.

Playing at quarterback, Briscoe led his team to a 27–11 record and three conference titles. He left with 22 school records, including completion percentage (55%), passing yards (4,935), touchdown passes (52), and total offensive yards (6,253). Briscoe was inducted into the College Football Hall of Fame in 2016.

Professional career
The Broncos intended to convert him to cornerback, but Briscoe had negotiated for a chance to compete for the quarterback position.

On September 29, 1968, starter Steve Tensi suffered a broken collarbone, and backup Joe DiVito was spotty.  Head coach Lou Saban summoned Briscoe from the sidelines in the fourth quarter against the Boston Patriots to give him a try.  Briscoe's first play was a 22-yard completion.  On his second series he orchestrated an 80-yard touchdown drive.  He completed a 21-yard pass and ran for 38 more himself, carrying it the last 12 yards for the score.

A week later, on October 6, Briscoe became the first starting African-American quarterback in the AFL.  He threw 14 touchdown passes that year in just five starts, including four on November 24 against Buffalo; both are still Broncos rookie records. He also threw for 335 yards in that game, a rookie record that stood until John Elway broke it in 1983, and one of only three 300+ yard rookie games in franchise history. He completed 41.5 percent of his passes, and averaged 7.1 yards per attempt and his 17.1 yards per completion led the American Football League (and ranks 18th all-time). He also ran for 308 yards and three touchdowns.

Before the 1969 season started, Briscoe, still determined to play quarterback, discovered that head coach Saban intended to use Pete Liske as the starter, so he asked to be released. He went to the AFL's Buffalo Bills where he was turned into a receiver, since the Bills already had superstar Jack Kemp, former Pro Bowler Tom Flores, and James Harris, another black quarterback with a more prototypical 6-foot-4 and 210-pound frame. Briscoe led Buffalo in touchdown catches in each of his three seasons there and in receptions twice.  In 1970, he was in the top two in receptions and receiving yards and became an All-Pro.

After the AFL-NFL merger, Briscoe played in the National Football League from 1970 though 1976, mostly with American Football Conference teams. In 1971, the Bills traded him to the Miami Dolphins for the first-round draft pick used to take Joe Delamielleure, who developed as a Hall of Fame guard.

Briscoe went on to win a pair of Super Bowls. Briscoe led the undefeated 1972 team with four touchdown receptions and was the leading receiver on the Dolphins in 1973, catching more passes than future Pro Football Hall of Famer, Paul Warfield.

Briscoe made stops with the San Diego Chargers and Detroit Lions, before ending his career in 1976 with the New England Patriots; he had ten receptions for 136 yards and one touchdown in 14 regular season games for the Patriots in 1976.  Briscoe caught a 16-yard touchdown pass from Steve Grogan in the Patriots 48–17 rout of the Oakland Raiders at Schaefer Stadium on October 3, 1976, which was the Raiders' sole loss that season. As a rookie, Briscoe was intercepted by Boston Patriots AFL All Star Defensive Back Leroy Mitchell in Denver's 35–14 rout of the Patriots at Fenway Park on November 3, 1968.  He is the only player to have been intercepted by a Patriot player and later to have caught a touchdown as a Patriot receiver.

Retirement and legacy
Upon retirement from professional sports, Briscoe moved to Los Angeles. He became established as a successful financial broker, dealing in municipal bonds. Briscoe became addicted to cocaine, but recovered after extensive rehab. In the 21st century, he worked as the director of the Boys and Girls Club in Long Beach, California before retiring. He founded a football camp for children.

A biopic film titled The Magician, based on Briscoe's life, has been under development for several years. Canadian actor Lyriq Bent has been approached to portray Briscoe in the film. In 2016, the University of Nebraska Omaha, Briscoe's alma mater, honored him with a statue of him.

Personal life
Briscoe's three marriages ended in divorce.  He had two children: Angela and Rebecca.

Briscoe died on June 27, 2022, at a hospital in Norwalk, California.  He was 76, and had developed pneumonia prior to his death, having been hospitalized for circulation issues in his legs.

See also
 List of American Football League players
 Racial issues faced by black quarterbacks

References

External links
 
 
 "Marlin 'The Magician' Briscoe: The Legendary Quarterback of the University of Omaha" online exhibit, University of Nebraska at Omaha Libraries' Archives & Special Collections.
 "Marlin Briscoe", Waymaker Productions, YouTube.

1945 births
2022 deaths
American football quarterbacks
American football wide receivers
American Football League players
Buffalo Bills players
Denver Broncos (AFL) players
Detroit Lions players
Miami Dolphins players
Nebraska–Omaha Mavericks football players
New England Patriots players
Omaha Mavericks men's basketball players
San Diego Chargers players
American Conference Pro Bowl players
College Football Hall of Fame inductees
Sportspeople from Omaha, Nebraska
Players of American football from Nebraska
Basketball players from Nebraska
African-American basketball players
African-American players of American football
20th-century African-American sportspeople
21st-century African-American sportspeople
Deaths from pneumonia in California
Burials at Rose Hills Memorial Park